Gobiopsis liolepis is a species of goby, a type of fish.

References

Gobiidae
Taxa named by Frederik Petrus Koumans
Fish described in 1931